Darby Plantation may refer to:

Darby Plantation (New Iberia, Louisiana), listed on the National Register of Historic Places (NRHP) in Iberia Parish
Darby Plantation (Edgefield, South Carolina), listed on the NRHP in Edgefield County

See also
Darby House (disambiguation)